The Litanies of Satan is the debut album by American avant-garde artist Diamanda Galás, released in the United Kingdom by Y Records in 1982; it was released in her home country in 1989.

Content 
The text for "The Litanies of Satan" is taken from a section of Les Fleurs du Mal by Charles Baudelaire. According to the album liner notes, the piece "devotes itself to the emeraldine perversity of the life struggle in Hell." The notes go on to state that "Wild Women with Steak-Knives," from the tragedy-grotesque by Diamanda Galás Eyes Without Blood, is "a cold examination of unrepentant monomania, the devoration instinct, for which the naive notion of filial mercy will only cock a vestigial grin."

Reception 

Trouser Press described it as "a disturbing and provocative piece."

Track listing
In some issues, the vinyl sides are oppositely labeled, while all compact disc reissues also present the tracks in the incorrect order.

Personnel
Diamanda Galás — vocals; tape and electronics on side one
Production personnel
Dick O’Dell — executive production
Dave Hunt — production, engineering on side one
Durand Rene Legault — recording, engineering assistant on side two
Richard Zvonar — engineering on side two
Will Gullette — photography
Martyn Lambert — design

Release history

References

External links
 

Diamanda Galás albums
1982 debut albums
Les Fleurs du mal in popular culture
Mute Records albums
Restless Records albums
Musical settings of poems by Charles Baudelaire
Y Records albums